Sanda Ladoși (born 2 January 1970 in Târgu Mureș) is a Romanian singer.

As a child, Sanda sang in various choirs and groups. Near the age of 10 she began to study music and learned piano, classical guitar and singing. Since she was born into a family of teachers, she pursued studies in education. However, she gave up her teaching career almost as soon as she graduated from Târgu Mureș. She moved to Bucharest to follow her dream of becoming a professional singer, while also studying law at the city's Titu Maiorescu University.

She has performed duets with Romanian stars such as Marcel Pavel, Ștefan Iordache, Ioan Gyuri Pascu, and Aurelian Temișan. She has performed at many concerts across Romania and at a great number of summer festivals abroad. She has released five albums to date and toured worldwide. She released her fifth album Khalini in 2006, which includes the song "I Admit". With "I Admit", she won in 2004 the Romanian National Selection for the Eurovision Song Contest at Istanbul. In the international finals, she came in 18th.

Sanda was also chosen to dub Mulan in the series Sofia the First.

References

 SOTUL SANDEI LADOSI, TACHE STEFAN SI MARIAN NASTASE PRADUIESC FIRMA PARAGON. TACHE STEFAN A SCAPAT, MARIAN NASTASE 10 ANI INCHISOARE. BANII NICIODATA RECUPERATI. PAGUBA 100.000 USD – 1998 – schema CECURILOR FALSE 
 
 
 
 
 SANDA LADOSI SI SOTUL TACHE STEFAN RIDICATI DE DIICOT 28.11.2017
 Schema “fabricilor de facturi” prin care sotul (TACHE STEFAN) Sandei Ladosi a dat un tun ilegal de 4 mil euro 
 SOTUL SANDEI LADOSI, TACHE STEFAN FRAUDA BRD SOCIETE GENERALE

1970 births
Living people
People from Târgu Mureș
Romanian women pop singers
Eurovision Song Contest entrants for Romania
Eurovision Song Contest entrants of 2004
21st-century Romanian singers
21st-century Romanian women singers